Let's Go is a travel guide series researched, written, edited, and run entirely by students at Harvard University. Let's Go was founded in 1960 and is headquartered in Cambridge, Massachusetts.

History
The first Let's Go guide was a 25-page mimeographed pamphlet put together by 18-year-old Harvard freshman Oliver Koppell and handed out on student charter flights to Europe.

In 1996, Let's Go launched its website, Letsgo.com, while publishing 22 titles and a new line of mini map guides.

Let's Go announced a new print publisher, Avalon Travel, upon the expiration of its contract with St. Martin's Press in 2009. The switch led to a new format for the insides of the books, new retro covers for the outsides, and a rebranding to emphasize Let's Go's student origins. The theme has been changed in 1999, 2002, 2005 and 2009. In 2014, Let's Go began self-publishing for the first time since 1970.

Editorial style
Let's Go has used many words to describe the style of its content. "Witty and irreverent" is possibly the most frequently used descriptor; the company takes pride in its youthful, casual, sometimes zany tone and trains its writers to avoid "brochure-ese". Let's Go also promotes the unvarnished opinions of its reviews, stating that they want the takeaway of every single listing, good or bad, to be clear to the reader. This honesty led to a lawsuit against Let's Go in 1990 as a result of a scathing review of an Israeli hostel, but the travel guide was victorious in court, upheld by the judges as "the modern equivalents of Thomas Paine or John Peter Zenger." Other traits the company has emphasized include its budget roots and social consciousness.

Titles
As of the 2019 series of guidebooks, Let's Go has published 75 titles covering six continents. The books range from country guides to adventure, city, budget, and road trip guides, many of which are still updated annually. Let's Go has also published 20 abridged, pocket-sized "map guides" (Amsterdam, Berlin, Boston, Chicago, Dublin, Florence, Hong Kong, London, Los Angeles, Madrid, New Orleans, New York City, Paris, Prague, Rome, San Francisco, Seattle, Sydney, Venice, and Washington DC), though these have been discontinued.

Notable alumni
Because Let's Go employees are all students when working for the travel guide, many of its alumni have gone on to careers in travel writing and other areas.

 Megan Amram, comedy writer and Twitter celebrity
 Jesse Andrews, novelist and screenwriter of the novel Me and Earl and the Dying Girl (2012)
 Darren Aronofsky, film director
 Jenny Lyn Bader, playwright
 Rick Barton, diplomat
 Elif Batuman, Turkish author and journalist
 Ben Beach, marathoner
 Jess Bravin, journalist and author
 Lisa Brennan-Jobs, journalist, author, and daughter of Steve Jobs
 Irin Carmon, writer and blogger
 Pete Deemer, tech entrepreneur
 David Eilenberg, television executive
 Eleni Gage, author
 James Gleick, author and essayist.
 Kristin Gore, author, screenwriter, and daughter of Al Gore
 Barak Goodman, Oscar-nominated documentarian
Ellen P. Goodman, Rutgers Law professor
 Adam Grant, organizational psychologist and Wharton professor
 Frank Huddle, Jr., former U.S. ambassador to Tajikistan
 Pico Iyer, travel writer, essayist, and novelist
 Kent M. Keith, author and academic
 Oliver Koppell, New York politician
 Andrew Laming, Australia politician
 Eric Lesser, Massachusetts politician
 Justin Levitt, American constitutional law professor
 Jane Lindholm, National Public Radio host
 Annie Lowrey, journalist
 Nathan Lump, travel writer
 Ghen Maynard, television producer and executive
 Emily Naphtal, competitive figure skater
 Celeste Ng, author
 Joanna O'Leary, food writer and literary historian
 Julie Cotler Pottinger, romance author
 Jeffrey Rosen, author and legal commentator
 Claire Saffitz, food writer
 Peter Sagal, radio host and writer
 Elizabeth Scarlett, author and professor, University at Buffalo
 Ashley Shuyler, founder of AfricAid
 Martin Sixsmith, author and TV/radio presenter
 Kaitlin Solimine, writer
 Alex Speier, sportswriter for the Boston Globe
 Adam Stein, screenwriter and director
 Thomas G. Stemberg, businessman and venture capitalist, co-founder of Staples Inc.
 Nicholas Stoller, screenwriter and director
 Andrew Tobias, columnist, author, and DNC treasurer
 Lisa Tolliver, media personality and academic-practitioner
 Graeme C.A. Wood, journalist and contributing editor at The Atlantic

In popular culture
There have been references (in a non-review/article context) to Let's Go in:

Films
 Bridget Jones's Diary (2001)
 What a Girl Wants (2003)
 Me and Earl and the Dying Girl (2015)

Music
 Let's Go (Rancid album), 1994 album

Print
Either/Or (2022), novel
The Economist
 MAD, magazine
 The Marriage Plot (2011), novel
 The Onion

Television
 Futurama
 Gilmore Girls
 How I Met Your Mother
 Seinfeld
 The Colbert Report
 The Daily Show
 The Simpsons
 Who Wants To Be A Millionaire?

References

External links
 LetsGo.com – Official site

Book series introduced in 1960
Harvard University publications
Travel guide books